Terence Daniel (also known as Tirlagh O'Donnell) was a sixteenth century priest in Ireland.

Daniel was appointed Dean of Armagh in 1550.  He served under both Queens Mary and Elizabeth

References

Deans of Armagh
16th-century Irish Anglican priests
People from County Armagh
Date of birth unknown
date of death unknown